American singer-songwriter Chris Stapleton has received multiple awards and nominations. He is the recipient of eight Grammy Awards, ten Academy of Country Music Awards, fourteen Country Music Association Awards, five Billboard Music Award, among others.

During his career he has published four studio albums, three of which, Traveller (2015), From A Room: Volume 1 (2017) and Starting Over (2021), were recognized by both the ACM Award for Album of the Year, the CMA Award for Album of the Year and the Grammy Award for Best Country Album. Stapleton was also honored with the ASCAP Vanguard Award in 2015 and with the Artist of the Year Honoree at the CMT Music Awards.

American Country Countdown Awards
The American Country Countdown Awards is an annual country music awards show that honors country artists based on their album sales, touring data and the amount of their radio airplay.

!
|-
|2016
|Traveller
|Top Country Album
|
| style="text-align:center;" |

Academy of Country Music Awards
The Academy of Country Music Awards, also known as the ACM Awards, were first held in 1966, honoring the industry's accomplishments during the previous year.

!
|-
|rowspan="6"|2016
|rowspan="1"|Traveller
|Album of the Year
|
| style="text-align:center;" rowspan="6"|
|-
| "Nobody to Blame"
| Song of the Year
|
|-
|rowspan="3"|Chris Stapleton
|Songwriter of the Year
|
|-
|New Male Vocalist of the Year
|
|-
|Male Vocalist of the Year
|
|-
| "Hangover Tonight" 
| Vocal Event of the Year 
|
|-
|rowspan="3"|2017
|Chris Stapleton
|Male Vocalist of the Year
|
| style="text-align:center;" rowspan="3"|
|-
|"Tennessee Whiskey"
| Song of the Year
|
|-
| "Fire Away"
| Video of the Year
|
|-
|rowspan="5"|2018
|rowspan="2"|Chris Stapleton
| Entertainer of the Year
|
| style="text-align:center;" rowspan="5"|
|-
| Male Vocalist of the Year
|
|-
| From A Room: Volume 1
| Album of the Year
|
|-
| "Broken Halos"
| Single Record of the Year
|
|-
| "Whiskey and You"
| Song of the Year
|
|-
|rowspan="5"|2019
|rowspan="3"|Chris Stapleton
| Songwriter of the Decade
| 
| style="text-align:center;" rowspan="5"|
|-
| Entertainer of the Year
|
|-
| Male Vocalist of the Year
|
|-
| From A Room: Volume 2
| Album of the Year
|
|-
| "Broken Halos"
| Song of the Year
|
|-
| 2020
| Chris Stapleton
| Male Artist of the Year
|
|-
| rowspan="4" | 2021
| rowspan="2"|Chris Stapleton
| Entertainer of the Year
| 
| style="text-align:center;" rowspan="4"|
|-
| Male Artist of the Year
| 
|-
| Starting Over
| Album of the Year
| 
|-
| “Starting Over”
| Song of the Year
| 
|-
| rowspan="4" | 2022
| rowspan="2"|Chris Stapleton
| Entertainer of the Year
| 
| style="text-align:center;" rowspan="4"|
|-
| Male Artist of the Year
| 
|-
| " I Bet You Think About Me (From The Vault) (Taylor's Version)" 
| Video of the Year
| 
|-
| "You Should Probably Leave" 
| Song of the Year
|

American Music Awards
The American Music Awards (AMAs) is a fan-voted music awards show, created by Dick Clark in 1973 for ABC.

!Ref.
|-
|2016
|Traveller
|rowspan=2|Favorite Country Album
|
| style="text-align:center;" |
|-
|2017
| From A Room: Volume 1
| 
|style="text-align:center;" |
|-
|rowspan="3"|2021
| Himself
|Favorite Country Artist
| 
|style="text-align:center;" rowspan="3"|
|-
|"Starting Over"
|Favorite Country Song
|
|-
|Starting Over
|Favorite Country Album
|
|-
|rowspan="2"|2022
| Himself
|Favorite Country Artist
| 
|style="text-align:center;" rowspan="2"|
|-
|"You Should Probably Leave"
|Favorite Country Song
|
|}

Americana Music Honors & Awards
The Americana Music Honors & Awards is the marquee event for the Americana Music Association. Beginning in 2002, the Americana Music Association honors distinguished members of the music community.

!Ref.
|-
|rowspan="2"|2016
|rowspan="1"|Chris Stapleton
|Artist of the Year
|
| style="text-align:center;" rowspan="2"|
|-
|rowspan="1"|Traveller
|Album of the Year
|
|-

ASCAP Awards
The American Society of Composers, Authors and Publishers honors its top members in a series of annual awards shows in seven different music categories: pop, rhythm and soul, film and television, Latin, country, Christian, and concert music.

ASCAP Country Music Awards

!
|-
| 2006
| "Your Man" 
| rowspan=7| Most Performed Songs
| 
| style="text-align:center;"|
|-
| 2007
| "Swing" 
| 
| style="text-align:center;"| 
|-
| 2008
| "Never Wanted Nothing More" 
| 
| style="text-align:center;"| 
|-
| 2009
| "Another You" 
| 
| style="text-align:center;"|
|-
| 2010
| "Keep On Lovin' You" 
| 
| style="text-align:center;"| 
|-
| 2011
| "Come Back Song" 
| 
| style="text-align:center;"|
|-
| 2012
| "Love's Gonna Make It Alright" 
| 
| style="text-align:center;"|
|-
| rowspan=2| 2016
| Chris Stapleton
| Vanguard Award
| 
| style="text-align:center;" rowspan=2|
|-
| "Crash and Burn"
| rowspan=4| Most Performed Songs
| 
|-
| 2018
| "Broken Halos"
| 
| style="text-align:center;"| 
|-
| 2021
| "Starting Over"
| 
| style="text-align:center;"| 
|-
| 2022
| "You Should Probably Leave" 
| 
| style="text-align:center;"|

ASCAP Pop Music Awards

!
|-
| 2022
| "Starting Over"
| rowspan=1| Most Performed Songs
| 
| style="text-align:center;"| 
|-

Billboard Music Awards
The Billboard Music Awards is an honor given by Billboard, a publication and music popularity chart covering the music business.

!
|-
|rowspan="2"|2016
|rowspan="1"|Chris Stapleton
|Top Country Artist
|
| style="text-align:center;" rowspan="2"|
|-
|rowspan="1"|Traveller
|Top Country Album
|
|-
|rowspan="2"|2017
|rowspan="1"|Chris Stapleton
|Top Country Artist
|
| style="text-align:center;" rowspan="2"|
|-
|rowspan="1"|Traveller
|Top Country Album
|
|-
| rowspan="5"|2018
| rowspan="3"|Chris Stapleton
| Top Billboard 200 Artist
| 
| style="text-align:center;" rowspan="5"|
|-
| Top Country Artist
| 
|-
| Top Country Male Artist
| 
|-
| rowspan="2"| From A Room: Volume 1
| Top Selling Album
| 
|-
| Top Country Album
| 
|-
| rowspan="3"|2021
| rowspan="2"|Chris Stapleton
| Top Country Artist
| 
| style="text-align:center;" rowspan="3"|
|-
| Top Country Male Artist
| 
|-
|Starting Over
| Top Country Album
| 
|-
| rowspan="4"|2022
| rowspan="2"|Chris Stapleton
| Top Country Artist
| 
| style="text-align:center;" rowspan="4"|
|-
| Top Country Male Artist
| 
|-
|"You Should Probably Leave"
| Top Country Song
| 
|-
|All-American Road Show Tour
| Top Country Tour
| 
|-

British Country Music Association Awards

!
|-
|rowspan="2"|2016
|rowspan="1"|Traveller
|International Album of the Year
|
| style="text-align:center;" rowspan="2"|
|-
|rowspan="1"|"Tennessee Whiskey"
|International Song of the Year
|
|-

CMT Awards

CMT Artists of the Year
Since 2010, CMT honors a selected group of country music artists annually.

!
|-
|2015
|rowspan=3|Chris Stapleton
|Breakout Award
|
| style="text-align:center;" |
|-
|2016
|rowspan=2|Honoree
|
| style="text-align:center;" |
|-
|2017
|
| style="text-align:center;" |
|-

CMT Music Awards
The CMT Music Awards is a fan-voted awards show for country music videos and television performances.

!
|-
|rowspan="3"|2016
|rowspan="2"|"Fire Away"
|Video of the Year
|
| style="text-align:center;" rowspan="3"|
|-
|Breakthrough Video of the Year
|
|-
|"Nobody to Blame" 
|CMT Performance of the Year
|
|-
| rowspan=3| 2018
| rowspan=2| "Say Something" 
| Video of the Year
| 
| style="text-align:center;" rowspan=3|
|-
| Collaborative Video of the Year
| 
|-
| "I Won't Back Down" 
| rowspan=2| CMT Performance of the Year
| 
|-
| rowspan=1| 2020
| rowspan=1| "Tell Me When It's Over" 
| 
| style="text-align:center;" rowspan=1|
|-
| rowspan=1| 2021
| rowspan=1| "Starting Over"
| Male Video of the Year
| 
| style="text-align:center;" rowspan=1|
|-
| rowspan=1| 2022
| rowspan=1| "Hold On" 
| CMT Performance of the Year
| 
| style="text-align:center;" rowspan=1|
|-

Country Music Association Awards
The Country Music Association Awards, also known as the CMA Awards or CMAs, are presented to country music artists and broadcasters to recognize outstanding achievement in the country music industry.

!
|-
|rowspan="3"|2015
|rowspan="1"|Traveller
|Album of the Year
|
| style="text-align:center;" rowspan="3"|
|-
|rowspan="4"|Chris Stapleton
|New Artist of the Year
|
|-
|Male Vocalist of the Year
|
|-
|rowspan="5"|2016
|Entertainer of the Year
|
| style="text-align:center;" rowspan="5"|
|-
|Male Vocalist of the Year
|
|- 
| "Nobody to Blame"
| Single of the Year
| 
|-
| "Fire Away"
| Music Video of the Year
| 
|-
|"You Are My Sunshine" 
|Musical Event of the Year
|
|-
|rowspan="3"|2017
|rowspan="2"|Chris Stapleton
|Entertainer of the Year
|
| style="text-align:center;" rowspan="3"|
|-
| Male Vocalist of the Year
| 
|-
| From A Room: Volume 1
| Album of the Year
| 
|-
|rowspan="5"|2018
|rowspan="2"|Chris Stapleton
|Entertainer of the Year
| 
| style="text-align:center;" rowspan="5"|
|-
| Male Vocalist of the Year
| 
|-
| From A Room: Volume 2
| Album of the Year
| 
|-
|rowspan="2"| "Broken Halos"
|Single of the Year 
| 
|-
|Song of the Year
| 
|-
|rowspan="3"|2019
|rowspan="2"|Chris Stapleton
|Entertainer of the Year
| 
| style="text-align:center;" rowspan="3"|
|-
| Male Vocalist of the Year
| 
|-
|"Millionaire"
|Single of the Year 
|
|-
|rowspan="2"|2020
|Chris Stapleton
|Male Vocalist of the Year
|
| style="text-align:center;" rowspan="2"|
|-
| "Second One to Know"
| Music Video of the Year
| 
|-
|rowspan="5"|2021
|rowspan="2"|Chris Stapleton
|Entertainer of the Year
|
| style="text-align:center;" rowspan="5"|

|-
| Male Vocalist of the Year
| 
|-
| Starting Over 
| Album of the Year
| 
|-
|rowspan="2"|"Starting Over"
| Single of the Year
| 
|-
| Song of the Year
| 
|-
|rowspan="5"|2022
|rowspan="2"|Chris Stapleton
|Entertainer of the Year
|
| style="text-align:center;" rowspan="5"|
|-
| Male Vocalist of the Year
| 
|-
|"I Bet You Think About Me" 
| Video of the Year
|
|-
|rowspan="2"|"You Should Probably Leave"
| Single of the Year
|
|-
| Song of the Year
|

Grammy Awards
A Grammy Award is an honor awarded by The Recording Academy to recognize outstanding achievement in the mainly English-language music industry.

!
|-
|rowspan="1"|2009
|“Blue Side of the Mountain” 
|Best Country Performance by a Duo or Group
|
|-
|rowspan="2"|2011
|Reckless 
|Best Bluegrass Album
|
|-
| “Where Rainbows Never Die” 
|Best Country Performance by a Duo or Group
|
|-
|rowspan="4"|2016
|rowspan="2"|Traveller
|Album of the Year
|
| style="text-align:center;" rowspan="4"| 
|-
|Best Country Album
|
|-
|rowspan="2"| "Traveller"
|Best Country Solo Performance
|
|-
| Best Country Song
|
|-
|rowspan="3"|2018
|From A Room: Volume 1
|Best Country Album
|
| style="text-align:center;" rowspan="3"| 
|-
|"Either Way"
|Best Country Solo Performance
|
|-
|"Broken Halos"
|Best Country Song
|
|-
|rowspan=3|2019
| "Say Something" 
|Best Pop Duo/Group Performance
|
| style="text-align:center;" rowspan=3|
|-
| From A Room: Volume 2
| Best Country Album
| 
|-
| "Millionaire"
| rowspan="2"|Best Country Solo Performance
| 
|-
| rowspan="3"|2022
| "You Should Probably Leave"
| 
| rowspan="3"|
|-
| "Cold"
| Best Country Song
| 
|-
| Starting Over
| Best Country Album
| 
|-
| rowspan="1"|2023
| "I'll Love You Till The Day I Die" 
| Best Country Song
| 
| rowspan="1"|
|-

iHeartRadio Music Awards
The iHeartRadio Music Awards recognizes the most popular artists and music over the past year as determined by listeners.

!
|-
|rowspan=2|2017
|Chris Stapleton
|Best New Country Artist
|
| style="text-align:center;" rowspan=2| 
|-
|Traveller
|rowspan=2|Country Album of the Year
|
|-
|2018
|From A Room: Volume 1
|
| style="text-align:center;"|
|-
|rowspan=1|2019
|"Say Something"
|Song of the Year
|
| style="text-align:center;" rowspan=1|

MTV Video Music Awards
The MTV Video Music Awards were established in 1984 by MTV to celebrate the top music videos of the year.

!
|-
|2018
|"Say Something" (with Justin Timberlake)
|Best Direction
|
| style="text-align:center;"|
|}

Pollstar Awards
The Pollstar Concert Industry Awards are held annually by Pollstar, to reward the best in the business of shows and concerts.
	
!
|-
|2018
| Chris Stapleton's All-American Road Show Tour
| Best Country Tour
|
| style="text-align:center;"|
|-

Teen Choice Awards 
The Teen Choice Awards were established in 1999 to honor the year's biggest achievements in music, movies, sports and television, being voted by young people aged between 13 and 19.

!
|-
| 2018
| "Say Something" 
| Choice Song: Male Artist
| 
| style="text-align:center;"|

UK Music Video Awards
The UK Music Video Awards recognise music videos created over the past 12 months across a variety of genres.

!
|-
|2018
|"Say Something" 
|Best Live Video
|
|style="text-align:center;"| 
|-
|}

Notes

References 

Stapleton, Chris
Awards